= Joy powder =

Joy powder is slang that could refer to the following drugs:

- Heroin
- Cocaine
- Marijuana
- Morphine
